Ye Shengzhang (7 December 1912 – 31 August 1966) was a Peking opera singer known for his "martial clown" roles (wǔchǒu). He served as a mentor to Li Yuru.



References

Citations

Bibliography
 .

External links
 "叶盛章" on Baike.com 

20th-century Chinese male  singers
1912 births
1966 deaths
Chinese male Peking opera actors
People persecuted to death during the Cultural Revolution
People from Taihu County
Singers from Anhui
Male actors from Anhui
20th-century Chinese male actors
Chou actors